The CAF First Round of 2002 FIFA World Cup qualification was contested between 50 CAF members.

The 50 teams were divided into 5 pools of 10 teams each. In each pool, the 10 teams were paired up to play knockout matches on a home-and-away basis. The winners advanced to the Final Round.

There were 130 goals scored in 50 matches, for an average of 2.6 goals per match.

Pool A

|}

First Leg

Second Leg

Tunisia win 5–1 on aggregate

Togo win 3–0 on aggregate

Algeria win 2–0 on aggregate

Senegal win 2–1 on aggregate

Morocco win 3–0 on aggregate

Pool B

|}

First Leg

Second Leg

Madagascar win 2–1 on aggregate

Zambia win 2–0 on aggregate

Angola win 8–1 on aggregate

South Africa win 3–0 on aggregate

2–2 on aggregate, Sudan win on away goals

Pool C

|}

First Leg

Second Leg

Sierra Leone won 4–2 on aggregate

Zimbabwe won 4–1 on aggregate

Ivory Coast won 4–2 on aggregate

Congo won 5–2 on aggregate

Libya won 4–3 on aggregate

Pool D

|}

First Leg

Second Leg

Congo DR won 10–2 on aggregate

Namibia won 4–1 on aggregate

Nigeria won 4–0 on aggregate

Cameroon won 6–0 on aggregate

Egypt won 6–2 on aggregate

Pool E

|}

First Leg

Second Leg

Malawi won 2–0 on aggregate

Ghana won 4–2 on aggregate

Guinea won 7–4 on aggregate

Burkina Faso won 4–2 on aggregate

Liberia won 1–0 on aggregate

External links
 FIFA.com Reports
 RSSSF Page

1
Qual